The 19th Screen Awards also 19th Annual Colors Screen Awards ceremony, presented by Indian Express Group, honored the best Indian Hindi-language films of 2012. The ceremony was held on 12 January 2013 at MMRDA Grounds, Mumbai. Hosted by Shahrukh Khan and co-hosted by Ayushmann Khurrana, Karan Johar and Vidya Balan.

Barfi! led the ceremony with 22 nominations, followed by Gangs of Wasseypur with 19 nominations and Kahaani with 15 nominations each.

Barfi! won 8 awards, including Best Director (for Anurag Basu) and Best Actor (for Ranbir Kapoor), thus becoming the most-awarded film at the ceremony.

Awards 
The winners and nominees have been listed below. Winners are listed first, highlighted in boldface, and indicated with a double dagger.

Jury Awards

Technical Awards

Popular  Choice Awards

Special awards

Superlatives

References

External links 
 The Screen Awards (2013) at the Internet Movie Database

Screen Awards